Mariano Néstor Torres (born 19 May 1987) is an Argentine professional footballer currently playing for Deportivo Saprissa in Costa Rica.

On 8 September 2009 Sport Club Corinthians Paulista signed the Argentinian midfielder. He had previously played for Boca Juniors, LASK Linz and Godoy Cruz.

Honours

Club
Saprissa
 Liga FPD: Apertura 2016, Clausura 2018, Clausura 2020, Clausura 2021
 CONCACAF League: 2019

References

External links
 
 
 

1987 births
Living people
Argentine footballers
Argentine expatriate footballers
Footballers from Buenos Aires
Boca Juniors footballers
LASK players
Godoy Cruz Antonio Tomba footballers
Club Atlético Huracán footballers
Cobresal footballers
C.D. Jorge Wilstermann players
Chilean Primera División players
Argentine Primera División players
Austrian Football Bundesliga players
Expatriate footballers in Chile
Expatriate footballers in Brazil
Argentine expatriate sportspeople in Brazil
Expatriate footballers in Bolivia
Expatriate footballers in Austria
Association football midfielders
Deportivo Saprissa players